Sandhanpur Union is a union of Ghatail Upazila, Tangail District, Bangladesh. It is situated 10 km east of Ghatail and 54 km northeast of Tangail in the middle of Madhupur tract.

Demographics

According to Population Census 2011 performed by Bangladesh Bureau of Statistics, The total population of Sandhanpur union is 47055. There are  households 12508 in total.

Education

The literacy rate of Sandhanpur Union is 39.6% (Male-41.6%, Female-37.7%).

See also
 Union Councils of Tangail District

References

Populated places in Dhaka Division
Populated places in Tangail District
Unions of Ghatail Upazila